George Cupples (2 August 1822 — 17 October 1891) was a Scottish journalist and a writer, who became famous at the end of 19th century for his maritime novels. In particular, his novel The Green Hand: adventures of a naval lieutenant was considered "one of the best sea stories ever written" at the time. His wife, Anne Jane Cupples, also became a famous writer of juvenile and children books.

Biography 

George Cupples was born on 2 August 1822 in Legerwood manse in south-east Scotland in the family of Reverend George Cupples. His paternal ancestors were Calvinistic ministers for at least three generations, and Cupples was intended for the same profession. Cupples started his education at the ministry, then studied at Dr. Munro's academy in Stirling. After graduating from the academy at the age of 12 in 1834, Cupples entered the University of Edinburgh. He did not complete his studies at the university, however, and in protest against the intended career, in 1839 Cupples travelled to Liverpool and sailed to India on the barque Patriot King as an apprentice.

When Cupples returned to Britain after 18 months at sea, he chose not to continue his maritime career, finding the life of a seaman too weary. Instead, he returned to the University of Edinburgh, graduated from it after the total of eight years of studies, and pursued a literary career. His most notable novel, The Green Hand was first published in Blackwood's Magazine from 1848 to 1851. Most of Cupples' journalistic work and some of his novels were published anonymously. On 18 May 1858, 35-year-old Cupples married 19-year-old daughter of post office official, Anne Jane Douglas, who also later pursued literary career, publishing almost 50 children books, using the name "Mrs. George Cupples."

In 1886, 63-year-old Cupples, already a famous maritime writer, repeated his voyage to India aboard the three-masted merchant ship Star of Bengal as an honorary first mate. The ship arrived in Calcutta on 19 August 1886; shortly after her arrival the ship's captain, William Legg, broke his leg. Under the circumstances, Cupples assumed the command and successfully brought the Star of Bengal home, arriving in London on 1 February 1887.

Cupples died on 17 October 1891 in Admiral House, in Newhaven, Edinburgh. He is buried in Dalry Cemetery in the south-west of Edinburgh. The grave lies in the south central section.

Selected bibliography   
 The Secret of Stoke Manor (unfinished, partially published in Blackwoods Magazine), Edinburgh, 1854
 The two frigates, London, 1859.
 The Green Hand: adventures of a naval lieutenant, London, 1856
 Captain Herbert (3 volumes), London, 1864
 Hinchbridge Haunted: a country ghoststory, Edinburgh, 1859
 Cupples Howe, Mariner. A tale of the sea., London, 1885
 Scotch Deer Hounds and their Masters (2 volumes), Edinburgh, 1894 (published posthumously with the assistance of his wife)
 Sermons and Discoveries by a Layman
 The Sunken Rock: A tale of the Mediterranean, Edinburgh, 1879
 Deserted ship: a story of the Atlantic, Boston, 1873 (165 pages)
"Fables: Illustrated By Stories From Real Llife", London, 1875

Family

He was married to Anne Jane Douglas daughter of Archibald Douglas.

See also 
 Anne Jane Cupples

References

Literature cited

External links

Scottish male novelists
Alumni of the University of Edinburgh
1822 births
1891 deaths
People from Berwickshire
Scottish journalists
Maritime writers